Theo Seager (born 15 January 1990) is an English gymnast. He comes from Manchester and his club is Bury GC. He is coached by Paul Hockwart.

He represented Great Britain at the Gymnastics World Championships at Rotterdam in 2010, helping the team to come 7th.

References

British male artistic gymnasts
Sportspeople from Manchester
1990 births
Living people
21st-century English people